The 2014–15 FA Cup qualifying rounds opened the 134th season of competition in England for 'The Football Association Challenge Cup' (FA Cup), the world's oldest association football single knockout competition. A total of 736 clubs were accepted for the competition, down 1 from the previous season's 737.

The large number of clubs entering the tournament from lower down (Levels 5 through 10) in the English football pyramid meant that the competition started with six rounds of preliminary (2) and qualifying (4) knockouts for these non-League teams. The 32 winning teams from Fourth qualifying round progressed to the First Round Proper, where League teams tiered at Levels 3 and 4 entered the competition.

Calendar and prizes
The calendar for the 2014–15 FA Cup qualifying rounds, as announced by The Football Association.

Extra preliminary round
Extra Preliminary Round fixtures were due to be played on 16 August 2014, with replays taking place no later than 21 August 2014. A total of 368 teams, from Level 9 and Level 10 of English football, entered at this stage of the competition.

Preliminary round
Preliminary round fixtures were due to be played on 30 August 2014, with replays no later than 5 September. A total of 320 teams took part in this stage of the competition, including the 184 winners from the Extra preliminary round and 136 entering at this stage from the six leagues at Level 8 of English football. The round included 34 teams from Level 10 still in the competition, being the lowest ranked teams in this round.

First qualifying round
First qualifying round fixtures were due to be played on 13 September 2014, with replays no later than 18 September. A total of 232 teams took part in this stage of the competition, including the 160 winners from the Preliminary round and 72 entering at this stage from the three leagues at Level 7 of English football. There were 10 teams from Level 10 still in the competition, being the lowest ranked teams in this round.

Second qualifying round
Second qualifying round fixtures were due to be played on 27 September 2014, with replays no later than 2 October. A total of 160 teams took part in this stage of the competition, including the 116 winners from the First qualifying round and 44 entering at this stage from the two divisions at Level 6 of English football. Ellistown & Ibstock United and Blaby & Whetstone Athletic from Level 10 were still in the competition, being the lowest ranked teams in this round.

Third qualifying round
Third qualifying round fixtures were due to be played on 11 October 2014, with replays taking place no later than 16 October 2014. A total of 80 teams took part in this stage of the competition, all winners from the Second qualifying round. The round featured six teams from Level 9 still in the competition, being the lowest ranked teams in this round.

Fourth qualifying round
Fourth qualifying round fixtures were due to be played on 25 October 2014, with replays taking place no later than 30 October 2014. A total of 64 teams took part in this stage of the competition, including the 40 winners from the Third qualifying round and 24 entering at this stage from the Conference Premier at Level 5 of English football. The round featured Willand Rovers, Greenwich Borough and Shildon from Level 9 still in the competition, being the lowest ranked teams in this round.

Competition proper

Winners from Fourth qualifying round advance to First Round Proper, where teams from League One (Level 3) and League Two (Level 4) of English football, operating in The Football League, first enter the competition.  See 2014–15 FA Cup for a report of First Round Proper onwards.

Notes

References

External links
 The FA Cup Archive

2014–15 FA Cup
FA Cup qualifying rounds